Guan Zhen (born February 6, 1985, in Tianjin) is a former Chinese professional footballer who last played as a goalkeeper for Shenzhen FC. He is currently the assistant goalkeeping coach at Shenzhen FC.

Club career

Shandong Luneng 
Guan would make his senior club debut on March 16, 2003, for Shandong Luneng in a league game versus Yunnan Hongta. His appearance was to make him the youngest goalkeeper to ever appear in the top tier in the Chinese league system, however this record was later broken by Wang Dalei. After his debut he would play understudy to Zong Lei and Deng Xiaofei for several seasons, however Shandong Luneng would bring in Li Leilei in the 2006 league season and Guan was loaned out to Chengdu Wuniu.

Chengdu Wuniu 
Guan would join second tier club Chengdu Wuniu on loan in 2006 to gain more playing time but failed to make it as their first choice goalkeeper. He would return to Shandong Luneng where he would once more be used as a third choice goalkeeper. Unable to improve upon his position Shandong Luneng were willing to let Guan leave at the end of the 2007 league season.

Jiangsu Sainty 
He transferred to second tier club Jiangsu Sainty at the beginning of the 2008 league season and was immediately placed as their first-choice goalkeeper within the team. He played extremely well enough to  immediately help the club in their push for promotion to the Chinese Super League by aiding them to win the 2008 Chinese League One title. The following season Guan's former team mate Deng Xiaofei was brought into the club and for a short period replaced Guan as the team's first choice goalkeeper, however he would eventually go on to win back his place within the team and help establish Jiangsu within the top tier.

Shijiazhuang Ever Bright 
In January 2015, Guan transferred to fellow Chinese Super League side Shijiazhuang Ever Bright.

Guan scored his first ever goal in his 100th top-tier match on May 8, 2016, converting a penalty in a 2–1 loss against Shanghai SIPG. Yasen Petrov, manager of Shijiazhuang, expressed that Guan would be the first penalty kicker of the club until he missed. He scored his second penalty on May 22, 2016, in a 1–1 home draw against Beijing Guoan. On June 19, 2016, Guan missed a penalty in a 1–0 victory against Henan Jianye before his teammate Rúben Micael took the other penalty of the match.

Shenzhen FC 
On February 8, 2017, Guan transferred to China League One side Shenzhen FC. He would make his debut appearance on 12 March 2017 against Dalian Transcendence F.C. in a league game that ended in a 6–0 victory. He would establish himself as a regular within the team and go on to gain promotion with the club at the end of the 2018 China League One campaign.

Guan Zhen retired in December 2020, and joined the backroom staff as an assistant goalkeeping coach.

International career
Guan was the first choice keeper for the Chinese U-20 team before the 2005 FIFA World Youth Championship that was managed by Eckhard Krautzun, however he was ruled out after suffering an injury before the tournament by his own teammate Wang Yongpo. He would go on to be promoted to the Chinese U-23 and was part of the squad that played in the Football at the 2006 Asian Games, however it was only after an impressive start to the 2009 Chinese Super League season with Jiangsu Sainty before Guan would be called up into Gao Hongbo's squad to face Kyrgyzstan in a 3–0 win on July 25, 2009, where he came on as a substitute for Zeng Cheng. His performance was good enough for him to be tried out in the 2010 East Asian Football Championship and then later included in the squad for the 2011 AFC Asian Cup.

Career statistics
Statistics accurate as of match played 31 December 2020.

Honours

Club
Shandong Luneng
Chinese FA Cup: 2004

Jiangsu Sainty
 China League One: 2008 
 Chinese FA Super Cup: 2013

Country
China PR national football team
 East Asian Football Championship: 2010

See also
 List of goalscoring goalkeepers

References

External links 
Official Jiangsu Sainty website

Player profile at Sodasoccer.com
Player stats at Sohu.com

1985 births
Living people
Association football goalkeepers
Chinese footballers
Footballers from Tianjin
China international footballers
Shandong Taishan F.C. players
Chengdu Tiancheng F.C. players
Jiangsu F.C. players
Cangzhou Mighty Lions F.C. players
Shenzhen F.C. players
2011 AFC Asian Cup players
Chinese Super League players
China League One players
Footballers at the 2006 Asian Games
Asian Games competitors for China